Enrique Demarco (12 October 1923 – 13 May 1994) was a Uruguayan cyclist. He competed in the individual and team road race events at the 1948 Summer Olympics.

References

External links
 

1923 births
1994 deaths
Uruguayan male cyclists
Olympic cyclists of Uruguay
Cyclists at the 1948 Summer Olympics
People from Durazno